Everyday Black Man is a 2010 film directed by Carmen Madden. It stars Henry Brown, C. Kelly Wright, Omari Hardwick and Tessa Thompson. It is a story about deception and a man's struggle to save his daughter.

Background
This was the debut for Carmen Madden, and it picked up an award. Henry Brown's performance was noted as "Down to a T" in a review by The other view.

Story
The film focuses on Moses, a local grocery store owner Moses played by Henry Brown. Moses has a past. One that was violent and one that he walked away from. He is now a dedicated community man. Moses has a daughter who has a daughter Claire (played by Tessa Thompson) who has no idea that he is her father and because of the past he has, he cannot tell her that he is her real father. He has been turned down for a loan from a bank and then becomes duped by a seemingly good man into letting his shop being used to sell drugs. The film takes another direction with Moses just being an ordinary insignificant man turning into a man who needs to take things to another level.

Cast
 Ahku as Darcy's Driver 
 Elynn Alonzo as Prostitute (as Karleen Griffin) 
 Afi Ayanna as Claire 
 Chris Ayles as William / Banker 
 Henry Brown as Moses 
 Crystal Bush as Nurse 
 Marion Christian as Store Bodyguard 
 Marjorie Crump-Shears as Mary / Grandmother (as Marjorie Shears) 
 Ronald Gardner as Officer 2 
 Ed Gilles III as Darcy 
 Jahkahn Bayshore Gulley as Delivery Kid 
 Dave Hall as Gang Member 
 Omari Hardwick as Malik 
 Daryl Anthony Harper as The Preacher 
 Corey Jackson as Sonny 
 Jermaine Steve Johnson as Young Moses 
 Mawiyah Johnson as Aisha 
 Emmanuel Lee as Frank 
 Mo McRae as Yousef (as Mo) 
 J.T. Smash as Officer 1 
 Marcus D. Spencer as Moses's Driver (as Big Spence) 
 Gabriela Sykes as Young Claire 
 Tessa Thompson as Claire 
 C. Kelly Wright as Gloria

References

External links
 
 Film Critics United: Everyday Black Man reviewed by Christopher Armstead
 Website
 Coffeerooms on DVD: Everyday Black Man 

2010 films
American action drama films
2010s English-language films
2010s American films